Oram Po is a 2007 Indian Tamil-language black comedy film starring Arya and Pooja, while Lal and John Vijay play supporting roles. The film, written and directed by the debutant husband-wife duo, Pushkar–Gayathri, was produced by V. Palanivel and A. C. Anandan for A.P. Film Garden. G. V. Prakash Kumar was the music director, Nirav Shah was the cinematographer, and Anthony handled the editing.

The film, revolving around auto rickshaw racing, was released after almost a year of production on 30 November 2007.

Plot
Chandru and Bigilu are close friends. Chandru is an expert auto driver and racer, while Bigilu is a mechanic expert at customizing autos to run at the dream speed of 130 km/h. Pichchai aka Son of Gun is the chief of a rival group who wants to outsmart the duo. Chandru, the race champ, tries to settle the dues for his auto through a race, which is almost a cake walk for him. He and Bigilu challenge Son of Gun to a race, and a date is fixed. Bigilu, meanwhile, introduces Chandru to his sister, who runs a biriyani shop. Chandru is attracted to her daughter Rani and woos her. The affair grows stronger, and the couple have sex. However, Chandru, is not interested in long-term commitment and tells Rani so. Shocked, Rani curses at him and moves away. On the D-day, Chandru is distracted by the memories of his love affair and loses the race and his auto. Later, Bigilu learns of the affair. The subplot of a smuggler's search for missing pearls adds flavour to the proceedings. The unpredictable and fun-filled climax puts everything in order.

Cast
 Arya as Chandru
 Lal as Bigil
 Pooja as Rani
 John Vijay as Pichchai (son of Gun)
 Jagan as Supply
 Thambi Ramaiah
 Nellai Siva as Annachi

Production
The film was earlier titled as "Auto". When directors Pushkar and Gayathri were travelling in an auto rickshaw they met an auto driver and received information about them, director said that this film will throw light on auto race. For the role of an auto driver Arya observed many auto-drivers. Pooja was selected to play a village girl who sells Biriyani, pairing with Arya for the second time after Ullam Ketkumae. Malayalam actor Lal was selected to play a supporting role, while debutant John Vijay was selected to play a negative character called "Son of Gun". Arya has done the most risky shots without a dupe ad for a scene that involves him driving the auto in GST Road he did that in the peak hour traffic in high speed with a camera mounted on the windscreen of the auto.

The release of 'Oram Po' was given an interim stay order by the Madras High Court, They somehow tried to release the film this month, but there was a hurdle in the form of a financier Mohankumar Jain from whom they had borrowed 15 lakh. He got a stay order from the court that the film cannot be released till 12 October, since they had not returned the money to him.

Soundtrack

The soundtrack was composed by G. V. Prakash Kumar. The song "Idhu Enna Mayam" marks the first time Bollywood playback singer Alka Yagnik has ever sung a Tamil song, as her previous Tamil songs were dubbed versions of her Hindi songs.

Reception
The movie received positive reviews. The Hindu wrote:"The strongest points of the movie are some excellent dialogues by Kumar Rajan—they’re genuinely funny and spontaneous, even when the characters are talking dirty— and the high-energy background score"and also praised the performances of lead actors "Arya is terrific as the cocky yet lovable Chandru (the combination of floppy hair, liquid brown eyes, dimpled chin and good physique should cement his ‘heartthrob’ status). Pooja looks lovely in minimal make-up and puts in a refreshingly natural performance. John Vijay is just an absolute riot as Son of Gun". indiaglitz wrote:"The movie looks into the world of a section of Chennai auto rickshaw drivers as realistic as possible. The approach by debutant directors Pushkar and Gayatri is refreshingly new, as they do not look at them from outside. They make a sincere attempt to look at their lives from within". Rediff wrote:" film may have failed in authentically portraying the difficult street life in Chennai, but succeeds, at least most of the time, as an entertainer". Sify wrote:"Debutant director duo Pushkar and Gayathri, the husband and wife team starts their Oram Po on a promising note, but somewhere along the way it runs out of gas". Behindwoods wrote:"Oram Po is part satire, part spoof and full entertainment set in the milieu of auto drivers’ lives. It is a two-hour auto rickshaw ride with all its bumps and swerves and unexpected curves. The movie has only a wafer thin story line but what lies between the wafers makes for all the entertainment".

Box office
The film was decent successful at the box office.

References

External links
 

2007 films
Indian black comedy films
Films scored by G. V. Prakash Kumar
2000s Tamil-language films
2007 directorial debut films
Films set in Chennai
Films directed by Pushkar–Gayathri